Stephen George Gardner (born 3 July 1968) is a former professional footballer who played as a central defender.

After starting as a member of the youth team at Manchester United, Gardner signed for then Football League Division Four side Burnley in 1987, making 115 first-team appearances in three seasons, including the 1988 Football League Trophy Final at Wembley Stadium, where they lost 2–0 to Wolves. Gardner was released by the Clarets in May 1990 and eventually signed for Bradford City in 1991, where he made 14 league appearances. After being released by Bradford, Gardner joined Bury but made only one league appearance and subsequently retired from professional football.

References

External links
Steve Gardner career stats at playerhistory.com

1968 births
Living people
Footballers from Middlesbrough
English footballers
Association football defenders
English Football League players
Burnley F.C. players
Bradford City A.F.C. players
Bury F.C. players